Leon Trani (died October 1966) was a Filipino boxer. He competed in the men's featherweight event at the 1948 Summer Olympics. At the 1948 Summer Olympics, he lost to Aleksy Antkiewicz of Poland.

Overall, Trani came in 17th place out of 30 participants. The 1948 Summer Olympics were his first and last Olympic games.

References

External links
 

Year of birth missing
1966 deaths
Filipino male boxers
Olympic boxers of the Philippines
Boxers at the 1948 Summer Olympics
Place of birth missing
Featherweight boxers